Julie Angela Segre is the Chief and Senior Investigator of the Translational and Functional Genomics Branch in the National Human Genome Research Institute at the National Institutes of Health. She was elected to the National Academy of Medicine in 2019, the American Academy of Arts and Sciences in 2020 and the National Academy of Sciences in 2022.

Early life and education

Segre was born in Berkeley, California, the daughter of Nina and  Gino Claudio Segrè. She was raised in Philadelphia, where her father was a professor of physics at the University of Pennsylvania. Segre received her B.A. summa cum laude in mathematics from Amherst College in 1987, where she later served on the board of trustees.  She received her Ph.D. in 1996 from the Massachusetts Institute of Technology. Segre then performed postdoctoral training in Molecular Genetics and Cell Biology at the University of Chicago (1996-2000).

Research and career

Segre came to the National Human Genome Research Institute of NIH in 2000 and was promoted to a senior investigator with tenure in 2007.

Segre's laboratory studies how the epidermis interfaces between the body and the environment.  Using genomic methodologies, Segre studies the bacteria and microbes of the skin microbiome. Segre's laboratory also develops genomic tools to track hospital-acquired infections of multi-drug resistant organisms.

Medical and research achievements
2013 received Service to America Medal
2015 elected as a Fellow to the American Academy of Microbiology
2019 elected to the National Academy of Medicine
2020 elected to the American Academy of Arts and Sciences
2022 elected to the National Academy of Sciences

References

External links
 
 
  (Elizabeth O. King Lecture delivered by J. Segre — discussion of 2011 outbreak of carbapenem-resistant Klebsiella pneumoniae)
 
 

Year of birth missing (living people)
Living people
American geneticists
Amherst College alumni
Massachusetts Institute of Technology alumni
National Institutes of Health people
NIH Women Scientists Project
21st-century American women scientists
American women biologists
Members of the National Academy of Medicine
Fellows of the American Academy of Microbiology